The House of Lies is a 1926 German silent drama film directed by Lupu Pick and starring Werner Krauss, Mary Johnson and Lucie Höflich. It is an adaptation of Ibsen's 1884 play The Wild Duck. The film's art direction was by Albin Grau.

Cast

References

Bibliography
 Hans-Michael Bock and Tim Bergfelder. The Concise Cinegraph: An Encyclopedia of German Cinema. Berghahn Books.

External links 
 

1926 films
German historical drama films
1920s historical drama films
UFA GmbH films
Films of the Weimar Republic
German silent feature films
Films directed by Lupu Pick
German films based on plays
Films based on works by Henrik Ibsen
Films set in Norway
Films set in the 1880s
German black-and-white films
1926 drama films
Silent historical drama films
1920s German films
1920s German-language films